The Basilica of St. Augustine in Campo Marzio, commonly known as Basilica of St. Augustine and Sant'Agostino, is a Roman Catholic titular minor basilica dedicated to Saint Augustine of Hippo. It is the mother church of the Order of Saint Augustine and it is located just northeast of the Piazza Navona in the rione of Sant'Eustachio in Rome, Italy.

First conceived in 1286, the current basilica (completed in 1483) is known for its Roman renaissance architecture style; housing artwork by Caravaggio, Raphael, and Guercino; and being the final burial place of Augustine's mother Saint Monica.

History

The primitive St. Tryphon in Posterula Church was built at this site in AD 700s & was dedicated to the martyr St. Tryphon of Campsada.  The Order of St. Augustine of the Catholic Church was founded at the Santa Maria del Popolo Basilica in Rome in 1244. The Augustinian friars soon desired to have their main monastery and church closer to Vatican City.  The Roman nobleman Egidio Lufredi donated land near here in Campo Marzio to the Augustinian friars in 1286. On 20 February 1287 Pope Honorius IV granted the St. Tryphon in Posterula Church to the Augustinian friars.

The first basilica, commissioned by Pope Boniface VIII, was built here by the Augustinian friars in 1296-1446 right next to the St. Tryphon in Posterula Church.  The construction of the second (current) basilica began in 1479.  It was commissioned by Pope Sixtus IV; designed by architect Baccio Pontelli (who also designed the Sistine Chapel); and funded by Cardinal Guillaume d'Estouteville.  Its construction was completed in 1483.  Giacomo di Pietrasanta (?-1495) built its façade by using travertine salvaged from the ruins of the Colosseum.  Its façade reads:  Guillermus de Estoutevilla, Episc[opus] Ostien[sis], Card[inalis] Rothomagen[sis], S[anctae] R[omanae] E[cclesiae], Camerarius, Fecit MCCCCLXXXIII = William d'Estouteville, Bishop of Ostia, Cardinal of Rouen of the Holy Roman Church, Camerlengo, Built This in 1483.

Its first restoration was completed in 1763 by Luigi Vanvitelli; its second restoration was completed in 1870; and its most recent restoration occurred in 1998-2000.

The title of Sant'Agostino has been held by Cardinal Jean-Pierre Ricard since 2006. It is the station church of the first Saturday in Lent.

As of 2022, it is open to the public Monday-Saturday at 7:15 am - 12:00 pm and 4:00-7:30 pm.  Tourists can not visit on Sundays when mass is held at 8:00 am, 10:00 am, 12:00 pm and 6:30 pm.

Artwork
The 1606 painting Madonna of Loreto (also known as the Madonna of the Pilgrims) by Caravaggio is located in the first chapel on the left.  The heirs of Ermete Cavalletti (?-1602) bought the Pieta Chapel on 4 September 1603 and soon commissioned Caravaggio to paint the Madonna for their family's chapel.  It was hung in 1606 at the altar in the Cavalletti Chapel (former Pieta Chapel) in place of a Pieta that was sold to Pope Paul V (formerly Cardinal Camillo Borghese).

The 1512 fresco Prophet Isaiah by Raphael is located on the third pilaster of the left nave. It was part of the funerary monument of Johannes Goritz (1455-1527; also known as Janus Corycius).  Isaiah holds a Hebrew scroll stating: “Open the doors, so that the people who believe may enter.” (Isaiah 26:2–3)  The statue Saint Anne and Virgin with Child (1512) by Andrea Sansovino is located below Raphael's Isaiah.

The 1521 sculpture Madonna del Parto (Our Lady of Childbirth) by Jacopo Sansovino is based, according to a legend, on an ancient statue of Agrippina holding Nero in her arms, is reputed by tradition to work miracles in childbirth. It is located in a niche to the right of the entrance and is surrounded by thank-offerings of flowers and candles.

The 1588 frescoes of St. John the Baptist and St. John the Evangelist by Avanzino Nucci are also here.

The 1616 ceiling fresco Assumption of Mary and three paintings by Giovanni Lanfranco are located in the Buongiovanni Chapel (in the left transept).

The 1600s painting Saints Augustine, John the Evangelist and Jerome by Guercino is also here.

The sculpture St. Thomas of Villanova Distributing Alms by Melchiorre Cafà and completed by his mentor Ercole Ferrata is located in the St. Thomas of Villanova Chapel (left end of transept). The etching Charity of St Thomas of Villanova by Cafà himself illustrates this same sculpture.

The 1628 High Altar was designed by Orazio Turriani.  It was previously (but erroneously) thought that Gian Lorenzo Bernini had designed it.

Its nave ceiling fresco was completed in 1868 by Pietro Gagliardi; who also made the 5 prophet pillar frescoes (including Ezekiel), 6 Old Testament women & 12 scenes from the life of the Virgin Mary.

Tombs
St. Tryphon of Campsada died in AD 250 and is located under the High Altar.

Saint Monica died in 387.  Her tomb was transferred here from the Santa Aurea Church in Ostia Antica, Italy on 11 April 1424.  Her sarcophagus was designed by Isaia da Pisa (1410-1464) in 1455, and is now located in the Chapel of Saint Monica (left of the apse).

Norways's Archbishop Olav Trondsson died on 25 November 1474. His tombstone reads: "CVI DEDERAT SACRAM MERITO NORVEGIA SEDEM HIC TEGIT OLAVI FRIGIDVS OSSA LAPIS" (Here a cold stone covers the bones of Olav, to whom Norway rightly gave the holy chair).

Cardinal Guillaume d'Estouteville died on 22 January 1483.

Cardinal Giuseppe Renato Imperiali died on 18 February 1737.  Pietro Bracci designed and sculpted his polychrome tomb in 1741.

The inscriptions found in the basilica have been collected and published by Vincenzo Forcella.

List of Cardinal-Protectors
Pope Sixtus V (1585–1590) established the titular church of a cardinal priest in April 1587.

See also
:Category:Burials at Sant'Agostino, Rome
History of medieval Arabic and Western European domes
History of Italian Renaissance domes
History of early modern period domes

References

Bibliography
 P Antonino Ronci and D. Torre, S. Agostino in Campo Marzio, Roma (Roma: D. Torre, [1950?]).

External links

Roman Catholic churches completed in 1483
Basilica churches in Rome
Titular churches
15th-century Roman Catholic church buildings in Italy
Renaissance architecture in Rome
Churches of Rome (rione Sant'Eustachio)
Order of St. Augustine
Augustinian churches in Italy
Luigi Vanvitelli buildings